The 1997 Big 12 Conference softball tournament was held at ASA Hall of Fame Stadium in Oklahoma City, OK from May 2 through May 4, 1997. Missouri won their first conference tournament and earned the Big 12 Conference's automatic bid to the 1997 NCAA Division I softball tournament. 

Standings
Source:

Schedule
Source:

All-Tournament Team
Source:

References

Big 12 Conference softball tournament
Tournament
Big 12 softball tournament